Carl Gustaf Gideon Broberg (18 October 1885 – 2 October 1952) was a Swedish rower who competed in the 1912 Summer Olympics. He was a crew member of the Swedish boat Göteborgs that was eliminated in the first round of the men's eight tournament.

References

External links

1885 births
1952 deaths
Swedish male rowers
Olympic rowers of Sweden
Rowers at the 1912 Summer Olympics
People from Skövde Municipality
Sportspeople from Västra Götaland County